Irvine West is one of the nine wards used to elect members of the North Ayrshire council. It was originally created in 2007 and returned four councillors, covering western parts of Irvine, i.e everything west of the A78 road, plus the south-eastern industrial area around Drybridge and Shewalton. A national boundary review prior to the 2017 local elections led to a new ward, Irvine South being created, the West ward losing some territory west of the River Irvine / south of the Annick Water, but still keeping four seats. A further re-organisation for the 2022 election in relation to the Islands (Scotland) Act 2018 did not affect the Irvine wards. In 2020, the population was 15,040.

Councillors

Election Results

2022 Election
2022 North Ayrshire Council election

Source:

2017 Election
2017 North Ayrshire Council election

2012 Election
2012 North Ayrshire Council election

2016 by-election
†† Irvine West SNP Cllr Ruth Maguire was elected as a MSP for Cunninghame South at the 2016 Scottish Parliament election. She resigned her Council seat on 25 May 2016 and a by-election was held on 11 August 2016 which was won by Labour's Louise McPhater.

2007 Election
2007 North Ayrshire Council election

References

Wards of North Ayrshire
Irvine, North Ayrshire